Eppinger is a surname. Notable people with the surname include:

 Hans Eppinger (1879–1946), Austrian physician 
 Jeff Eppinger (born c. 1960), American computer scientist, entrepreneur and Professor at the Carnegie Mellon University
 Steven D. Eppinger (born 1961), American engineer, and Professor of Management

See also
 Euclides D crater, a satellite crater of Euclides, formerly known as Eppinger